The 1993 Internationaux de Strasbourg doubles event was part of the 1993 Internationaux de Strasbourg women's tennis tournament which was part of Tier III of the 1993 WTA Tour and held from 17 May until 23 May 1993 in Strasbourg, France. Patty Fendick and Andrea Strnadová were the defending doubles champions, but none competed this year. Shaun Stafford and Andrea Temesvári won the title by defeating Jill Hetherington and Kathy Rinaldi 6–7(5–7), 6–3, 6–4 in the final.

Seeds

Draw

Draw

References

External links
 Official results archive (ITF)
 Official results archive (WTA)

Internationaux de Strasbourgandnbsp;- Doubles
1993 Doubles
1993 in French tennis